The Yuat languages are an independent family of five Papuan languages spoken along the Yuat River in East Sepik Province, Papua New Guinea. They are an independent family in the classification of Malcolm Ross, but are included in Stephen Wurm's Sepik–Ramu proposal. However, Foley and Ross could find no lexical or morphological evidence that they are related to the Sepik or Ramu languages.

It is named after the Yuat River of northern Papua New Guinea. Yuat languages are spoken mostly in Yuat Rural LLG of East Sepik Province.

Languages
The Yuat languages proper are:
Changriwa
Mekmek
Kyenele (Miyak)
Biwat (Mundugumor)
Bun

Classification
Foley (2018) provides the following classification.

Yuat family
Changriwa
Mekmek
Miyak; Bun, Mundukumo (Biwat)

Changriwa and Mekmek are attested only by short words, and are tentatively grouped as separate branches by Foley (2018: 226) due to scanty evidence.

Pronouns
The pronouns Ross (2005) reconstructs for proto-Yuat are:

{| class=wikitable
|-
| I || *ŋun || we || *amba
|-
| thou || *ndi || you || *mba
|-
| s/he || *wu || they || ?
|}

Mundukumo and Miyak pronouns are:

{| 
! person !! Mundukumo !! Miyak
|-
! 1sg
| ŋə || ŋə
|-
! 2sg
| də || də
|-
! 3sg
| u || u
|-
! 1excl
| i || ni
|-
! 1incl
| abə || aba
|-
! 2pl
| ya || be
|-
! 3pl
| wa || vara
|}

Vocabulary comparison
The following basic vocabulary words are from Davies & Comrie (1985), as cited in the Trans-New Guinea database:

{| class="wikitable sortable"
! gloss !! Biwat !! Kyenele (Kyaimbarang dialect) !! Kyenele (Miyak dialect)
|-
! head
| fop; fopeh || ϕɔp∘ || ᵽop
|-
! hair
| fufuimaivi; fufuimaye || ϕə'ziru || fusibɩľu
|-
! ear
| tuanhe; tundu || 'twan || tandu
|-
! eye
| siketeh; sipta || 'ɕikɯ || sɩpʰala
|-
! nose
| gerekeh; ŋerek || 'ŋəŋərɩ || nʌnɛlɩŋ
|-
! tooth
| andu; andusivahe || 'ŋandu || ŋandu
|-
! tongue
| be; behe || 'mbᴶe || mpe
|-
! leg
| gambang; geambangeh || ŋkaᵐbaᵐgat∘ || ŋgambaŋ
|-
! louse
| uta; utaeh || uta || wututʰoma
|-
! dog
| ken; kenhe || kᴶɛn || gɛn
|-
! pig
| vereh; vre || βɛrɩ || ƀeǏe
|-
! bird
| kaok; kaokhek || hɔpᴶɛ || wanma
|-
! egg
| momoateh; mumuat || 'majmuma || wanmuma
|-
! blood
| amberaeh; ambra || ambara || ambala
|-
! bone
| amfuva; amfuvaheh || amϕu || amᵽuwa
|-
! skin
| gamfuin; iaveteh || 'vɨza || nᵽɩsakʰ
|-
! breast
| meru; meruhe || mi || miřu
|-
! tree
| mung; mungeh || mu || mï
|-
! man
| foakpa; fuakpahe || aβɨd || aƀɷt
|-
! woman
| arepa; arepahe || mᴶe || miandu
|-
! sun
| va; vaeh || βanma || ƀanma
|-
! moon
| mumere; mumereh || 'gəŋat∘ || ŋgɨŋat
|-
! water
| mam; mumeh || 'maŋam || maŋam
|-
! fire
| mehen; men || mɨn || mɨn
|-
! stone
| ghateh; yiak || mɨndəm || mɨndɩm
|-
! road, path
| maikua; miakuahe || maj || mayt
|-
! name
| vu'geh; vuŋ || wuŋ || 
|-
! eat
| ueh jiveh; u-u give || ɕɛnɕɛn || tšɛntšɛntšuƀa
|-
! one
| nategeh; natek || ŋajkə || ŋaykʰʌkʰ
|-
! two
| arauu; aravueh || aɽawi || aǏawin
|}

Grammar
Yuat languages distinguish inclusive and exclusive first person pronouns, a feature not found in most other Papuan languages. This tyopological feature has also diffused from Yuat into the Grass languages, which are spoken contiguously to the Yuat languages.

Yuat grammar and phonology are similar to those of the neighboring Ramu languages. Yuat verbal morphology is relatively simple.

Yuat languages are accusative, unlike many other Papuan languages, e.g., Trans New Guinea, East Cenderawasih Bay, Lakes Plain, South Bougainville, which are all ergative.

Word order in Yuat languages, like in the Yawa languages, is rigidly SOV, whereas in many other Papuan families, OSV word order is often permitted (as long as the verb is final).

See also
Maramba language, a possibly spurious language often listed as Yuat.
Upper Yuat languages

References

External links
Yuat languages database at TransNewGuinea.org

 
Language families
Papuan languages
Languages of East Sepik Province